The Sinclair Loading Rack, near Seminole, Oklahoma, was built in 1928 by Sinclair Oil.  It was listed on the National Register of Historic Places in 1985. It has apparently been demolished.

References

External links

National Register of Historic Places in Seminole County, Oklahoma
Buildings and structures completed in 1928